James Putnam Goodrich, (February 18, 1864 – August 15, 1940), was an American politician and member of the Republican Party who served as the 29th governor of Indiana from 1917 to 1921. His term focused on reforming the operations of the state government and overseeing the state's contributions for World War I. He nearly died twice during his term, and spent a considerable time bedridden. Following his term as governor, he became increasingly wealthy from his business interests and owned a controlling share in many companies.

Early life

Family and background

James Putnam Goodrich was born on February 18, 1864, in Winchester, Indiana, the son of John Baldwin and Elizabeth Edger Goodrich. His father was an attorney and suffered from tuberculosis; he died in 1872. Goodrich attended public schools and intended to enter the US Naval Academy. He earned an appointment to the school, but he suffered a severe hip injury after falling out of a tree ending his prospect for a career in the military and forcing him to decline the offer.

Goodrich taught in Randolph County public schools for two years to save money for college. He then enrolled in DePauw University, where he was a member of Phi Kappa Psi fraternity. In college he became friends with Albert J. Beveridge who influenced him to be involved in politics. After attending college for two years, he was forced to quit for lack of funds, and began to study law with Enos Watson, the father of his classmate James E. Watson.

Party leader

Admitted to the bar in 1887, Goodrich practiced law in Winchester and quickly gained prominence in Republican politics. He was involved in a variety of organizations including the Knights of Labor, the Grange Movement, Knights of Pythias, and the Republican Party. In 1897 he became chairman of the Randolph County Republican Party and was later elevated to serve as state chairman from 1901 to 1910 and a national committeeman from 1912 to 1916. His time in party leadership was difficult for him as the party was wracked by a growing internal division over various progressive agenda items. Charles W. Fairbanks was trying to lead the party to the right, while Albert J. Beveridge was trying to pull the party to the left. Despite Goodrich's attempts to heal the division, the conflict between the two men split the party in 1912, as the progressive wing left to form a new party.

In 1910, he moved his law practice to Indianapolis. His investments in farms, grain elevators, coal mines and banks made him wealthy. For the next five years he spent his time working in his law practice and overseeing his business interests. He returned to active politics again in 1915 when he announced he would run for governor. Indiana had just begun implementing its new primary method of electing candidates, and removing candidate selection by convention. He defeated Warren T. McCray and Quincy Alden Myers by over 50,000 votes to win the nomination.

Governor

Tax reform

In the general election, the campaign focused primarily on prohibition and tax reforms of the previous administrations. He defeated Democrat John A. M. Adair in the November election by plurality. Goodrich's primary goal was to bring "efficiency and economy" to the government. Almost all of the state's primary source of revenue came through property tax which was seen as unfairly targeting farmers and the rural parts of the state. In 1917 Goodrich tried to have a constitutional convention called to amend the Constitution of Indiana to allow excise taxes to be imposed.

Opponents of the tax lobbied the Indiana General Assembly to kill the excise tax bills. The General Assembly approved the constitutional convention but the opponents took the measure to court. The Indiana Supreme Court ruled that the legislature had no constitutional authority to call a convention, and that a convention could only be called if approved by popular vote. Earlier court decisions had stated the legislature also had no power to amend the constitution, effectively creating a narrow and difficult path for amendment. The decision ended the attempted imposition of new taxes but started a movement that succeeded in later years.

Although he could not have excise taxes legalized, he did succeed in having legislation passed in 1919 to standardize property tax assessment across the state and grant the State Board of Tax Commissioners power to override local assessments, which effectively led to higher property values being attributed to city properties to ensure that the rural part of the state was no longer paying the majority of the state's revenues.

World War I

Goodrich began several measures to reform the civil service. He began by attempting to eliminate the patronage system. He eliminated numerous positions by not hiring anyone to fill them, but his plans were soon prevented by the need to grow the state government to manage the recruitment for World War I, which the United States entered in 1917. That state sent over 130,000 troops in its largest deployment since the American Civil War. At least 3,354 soldiers were killed or died from disease in the war. As a percentage of the population, this was higher than any other state. Goodrich's marketing of war bonds was extremely successful, leading other states to copy his techniques.

In August 1917, he contracted typhoid after touring a prison in northern Indiana. The sickness left him bedridden for two months, bordering on death several times. He was nursed back to health in the Indianapolis Methodist Hospital. He did not return to the statehouse until November, but had to deal with several issues, including coal shortages, from his home. He created a commission led by Will Hays to assist him in organizing and directing the state's resources.

In the spring of 1918, Goodrich was driving home after attending a military send-off when he was struck by a streetcar. The accident was very serious and he suffered bone fractures in his hip, skull, ribs, and collarbone. He was again near death, but survived. The accident left him greatly weakened and he was forced to walk with a cane for the rest of his life.

Amendments

During 1919, the United States Congress passed the Eighteenth Amendment to the United States Constitution, banning the sale of liquor, and the Nineteenth Amendment to the United States Constitution, granting women the right to vote. At the passage of each amendment, Goodrich called a special one-day legislative session to have the amendments ratified by the state. When he signed the 18th Amendment into law, Indiana became the final state needed to add it to the federal constitution, beginning national prohibition. Among Goodrich's other accomplishments in office were the creation of a state highway commission, creation of a department of conservation on the heels of the development of state parks (at the behest of his close friend Richard Lieber), and approval for the creation of the Indiana World War Memorial. He called a one-day session of the legislature on January 16, 1920, to ratify the Women's Suffrage Amendment to the United States Constitution.

Later life

In 1920, Goodrich was Indiana's favorite son candidate for the Republican nomination for president, losing to Senator Warren G. Harding.  As president, Harding appointed Goodrich to the Russian Relief Commission.  Goodrich made four trips to Russia, then governed by the Bolshevik regime of Vladimir Lenin, and gained a reputation as one of America's best-informed observers of conditions there.  Goodrich also served in Herbert Hoover's American Relief Administration and on the St. Lawrence Waterway Commission.  He remained active in Republican Party politics and made large donations from his personal fortune to Wabash College in Crawfordsville, Indiana, where he served on the board of trustees.

He became increasingly wealthy in his later life from his business investments. He successfully founded a business empire that lasted nearly a century. By the time of his death he owned a major stake in Central Newspapers, and held controlling interests in the Indiana Telephone Company, Goodrich Brothers' Company, City Securities and a host of smaller businesses.

He died on August 15, 1940, at the Randolph County Hospital in Winchester, Indiana, after suffering a cerebral hemorrhage. He is buried in Fountain Park Cemetery in Winchester.  Goodrich Hall at Wabash College was named in his honor.

Electoral history

See also

List of governors of Indiana

References
Notes

Bibliography

External links
 Indiana Historical Bureau: Biography and portrait
 National Governors Association - Goodrich Bio
James Goodrich at FindAGrave

1864 births
1940 deaths
Republican Party governors of Indiana
People from Winchester, Indiana
DePauw University alumni
American Presbyterians
20th-century American politicians